The Maharana is a variation on the Indian royal title Rana.
Maharana denotes 'king of kings', similar to the word "Maharaja".

Ruler title in British India

Salute states 
The gun salutes enjoyed by the states that acceded to the Dominion of India on 14 August 1947, included the following Maharanas:

Hereditary salute of 19-guns (21-guns local): the Maharana of Udaipur State (Mewar)
Hereditary salute of 13-guns the Maharana of Rajpipla
Hereditary salute of 11-guns: the Maharana of Barwani
 
Hereditary salutes of 9-guns:
The Maharana of Danta
The Maharana of Wadhwan
The Maharana of Sant
Some of the rulers were granted increased gun salutes after the independence, e.g. the above-listed Maharana of Mewar (Hindu; at Udaipur, Maharajpramukh in Rajasthan) was raised to first place in the Order of Precedence, displacing the Nizam of Hyderabad and Berar (Muslim), and all 9-gun states were permitted the use of the style of Highness.

Non-salute states ruled by a Maharana

Compound ruler titles
The Maharana Raj Sahib of Wankaner - Hereditary salute of 11-guns
The Maharana Sahib of Dharampur

References

Heads of state
Royal titles
Noble titles
Titles of national or ethnic leadership
Medieval India
Udaipur
Indian feudalism
Titles in India